Eva Ingersoll Brown Wakefield (1892 – 1 April 1970) was a writer, poet, freethinker, and an authority on the life of Robert G. Ingersoll, her grandfather.

Personal life 

Eva Ingersoll Brown Wakefield was born in Dobbs Ferry, New York in 1892, the daughter of Walston H. and Eva Ingersoll Brown. Her mother, Eva Ingersoll Brown, was a suffragist and activist. She was tutored as a child, and later graduated from Columbia University.

In 1917, Brown married McNeal Swasey, but they later divorced. She married Sherman Day Wakefield, an author, editor, and bibliographer, in 1932. The wedding was performed by John Lovejoy Elliott of the New York Society for Ethical Culture, at the home of her aunt, Maud Ingersoll Probasco. Sherman Wakefield was on the editorial staff of The Humanist and also of Progressive World. Eva herself was a contributor to The Humanist, as well as writing poetry. One of her poems was included in an anthology compiled by Edwin Markham, with whom she studied.

A passionate defender of her grandfather's legacy, Eva Ingersoll Wakefield published The Life and Letters of Robert G. Ingersoll in 1951, and later donated a significant amount of 'Ingersolliana' to the Library of Congress, the Abraham Lincoln Presidential Library and Museum, and other archives. As well as personal collections and copies of letters kept by her mother (Ingersoll's daughter) and aunt, Wakefield gathered correspondence from letters and journals, and from the collection of Harry Houdini.

Activism 

Eva Ingersoll Brown Wakefield was one of the earliest members of the First Humanist Society of New York, founded in 1929, and later President of the New York Chapter of the American Humanist Association.

During the 1930s, Wakefield was active in the Manhattan Branch of the Women's International League for Peace and Freedom. She was also director of the Vivisection Investigation League  and a member of the National Society of Colonial Dames in the State of New York.

In addition to editing The Life and Letters of Robert G. Ingersoll, Wakefield was secretary of the Robert G. Ingersoll Memorial Association. which maintained the Robert Ingersoll Birthplace in Dresden, N.Y., as a museum.

Death 
She died on 1 April 1970 at the Carolton Hospital in Fairfield, Connecticut. At her memorial service, in lieu of flowers, contributions to the R.G. Ingersoll Memorial Association were requested. Sherman Day Wakefield died the following year.

References

External links 

 The Life and Letters of Robert G. Ingersoll (English edition) at Internet Archive

1892 births
1970 deaths
People from Dobbs Ferry, New York
American writers
American animal rights activists
Women's International League for Peace and Freedom people
American Humanist Association
Vivisection activists
American humanists